Tyler Park may refer to:

 Tyler Park, Louisville, a neighborhood in Kentucky
 Tyler Park Historic District, in Lowell, Massachusetts

See also
 Tyler State Park (disambiguation)